Vichuga is a town in Ivanovo Oblast, Russia, located  northeast of Ivanovo. Population:     53,000 (1970).

History
Vichuga was first mentioned as a volost in the will of Ivan III in 1504. Marshal of the Soviet Union Aleksandr Mikhaylovich Vasilevsky was born in Novaya Golchikha, now part of Vichuga, on 30 September 1895.

Administrative and municipal status
Within the framework of administrative divisions, Vichuga serves as the administrative center of Vichugsky District, even though it is not a part of it. As an administrative division, it is incorporated separately as the Town of Vichuga—an administrative unit with the status equal to that of the districts. As a municipal division, the Town of Vichuga is incorporated as Vichuga Urban Okrug.

References

Notes

Sources

Cities and towns in Ivanovo Oblast
Kineshemsky Uyezd